The Suru Valley is a valley in the Kargil District in the Union Territory of Ladakh, India. It is drained by the Suru River, a  tributary of the Indus River. The valley's most significant town is Sankoo. 

Horses, yaks and other animals can be found in the valley. In winter Suru Valley experiences heavy snowfall and avalanches. The literacy rate of Suru Valley is very low as compared to other parts of Ladakh.

History 

The Suru Valley was historically ruled from Kartse, a fort in a branch valley near Sankoo. An inscription names its ruler as Tri-gyal. Tibetologist A. H. Francke believes that the dynasty of Tri-gyals might have been in existence prior to the formation of the Maryul kingdom (in modern Ladakh) in the 10th century. However, there is no mention of it in Ladakh Chronicles. When the Maryul kingdom was formed under  Lhachen Palgyigon, its extent ran up to the Zoji La pass.

The principality of Kartse apparently controlled the entire western Ladakh, from Mulbekh and Wanla in the east to Dras in the west, even though the extent of territory would have varied with time. The Tri-gyals were Buddhist and adopted the religion from Kashmir in ancient times. They commissioned a giant Maitreya rock carving in the vicinity of Kartse, and others at Mulbekh and possibly Apati.

The conversion of Kashmir to Islam in the 14th century had implications for western Ladakh. Baltistan was invaded during the reign of Sultan Sikandar, and the influence of Islam spread there. Zain-ul-Abidin raided Ladakh, Guge and Purang (in western Tibet) and collected tribute. The Tri-gyal of Kartse is said to have become his vassal and assisted in the invasions.

Some time after this, a Muslim chieftaincy connected to Skardu appeared in Purig, first at Sod northeast of Kargil, then with a branch at Chiktan northeast of Namika La.
During the invasion of Ladakh by Mirza Haidar Dughlat in 1532, Sod and Chiktan appear to have submitted, but not Kartse. Joint raids were conducted on Kartse but they failed. The chief or commander of Suru, named "Baghan", is also said to have been killed during one of the raids.

A succession of Ladakhi kings from Tashi Namgyal onwards attempted to make forays into Purig, but Kartse is not mentioned by name until the time of Deldan Namgyal. Deldan Namgyal, having made peace with Lhasa and the Mughal Empire in Kashmir in his early years, sent a comprehensive invasion force to Purig under general Shakya Gyatso. Chiktan, Pashkum, Sod and Kartse were all conquered. Tri Sultan of Kartse, who appears to have been an independent king at that time, was taken prisoner. Kashmir sent a small force to check the Ladakhis, but it was repulsed.
After the Tibet–Ladakh–Mughal War (1679–1683), Ladakh was apparently compelled to return the Purig principaliies to their former independence.

In the early 18th century, the Suru valley became part of the chiefdom of Purig.  According to local traditions, around the year 1720, Mohammed Thi Sultan, who did not have an heir, adopted the Ladakhi ruler Nyima Namgyal as his son. After Nyima Namgyal's abdication, Purig was assigned to his second son Tashi Namgyal to rule independenly. Five noble familites of Purig are said to have paid tributes to Tashi Namgyal at Mulbekh.
After Tashi Namgyal, Purig reverted as an integral par of Ladakh.

Islam was introduced into the area from the 16th century onward by preachers travelling through Baltistan. The Dogras conquered the entire area by 1847 and it proved to be disastrous for the natives. The Dogras were especially harsh to Muslims (including the nobles) in the area, and they attempted to rebel against the Dogras. The current line of control runs near modern Kargil.

People

The Suru valley is inhabited 25,000 by people of Dard and Tibetan descent. The majority of the population are followers of Shi'a Islam. According to local tradition, the populace was converted from Tibetan Buddhism during the rule of Thi-Namgyal, chief of Kartse and his Balti wife Thi Lha Khatun, who brought Muslim scholars to the area, which ultimately led to many conversions. Beyond Parkachik, the valley is practically uninhabited other than a couple of tiny settlements (Yuldo and Julidok) that make up Rangdum. People here are socially and culturally part of neighbouring Buddhist Zanskar and support the 18th century Rangdum Monastery belonging to the Gelugpa sect of Tibetan Buddhism. About 25 km south of Rangdum Monastery, the 4,400 m (14,436 ft) Pensi La (pass) leads into Zanskar

Religion
Almost the entire population of Suru valley are adherents of Shia Islam. A small fraction of the population also follows the Sunni branch of Islam, mostly concentrated in the villages of Panikhar and Prantee. The few other religious demographics shown in the census are mostly migrant workers from other parts of India.

Languages
The Purgi language is  the predominent language in the Suru Valley, spoken by about 95 percent of the people in the Sankoo Tehsil.

Landscape and agriculture
The lower part of the valley, at altitudes below 3,000 metres (9,843 ft), is one of the most agriculturally productive parts of Ladakh with two crops a year being harvested, watered by the run-off from the very heavy winter snowfalls, and even plantations of willow and poplar trees making it a relatively lush and very attractive area, but around Rangdum the landscapes are stark, flat moorlands ringed by arid crags. The spiky white topped mountain peaks of the Nun-Kun massif, topping 7000 m, are visible from several places in the valley.

Tourism
Despite considerable potential, tourism activity is very limited in the valley with most visitors rushing through to Padum and Zanskar. There are few facilities for visitors but Ladakh UT Tourism does have basic tourist bungalows in several of the villages. and there's a summer tent-camp in Rangdum. Tangole village is a possible starting point for mountaineering expeditions up Nun Kun.

Notes

References

Bibliography
 
 
 
 Nicola Grist (1998), Local Politics in Suru Valley of Northern India (PhD Thesis)
 
 
 
 
 
 
 
 
 Janet Rizvi. (1996). Ladakh: Crossroads of High Asia. Second Edition. Oxford University Press, Delhi. .

External links 

Geography of Ladakh
Valleys of Ladakh
Ladakh